Adolph Mongo (born January 15, 1954) is an American political advisor and radio host. He currently resides in Detroit, Michigan, where he is an on-air radio personality for 910 AM Superstation/WFDF, as the host of Detroit in Black & White.

Mongo was a political consultant to Detroit's mayor, Coleman Young and Kwame Kilpatrick, 1998 Michigan Democratic Party gubernatorial nominee Geoffrey Fieger, six Michigan Court of Appeals judges, five Wayne County Circuit Court judges, three Wayne County prosecutors (John O'Hara, Mike Duggan and Kym Worthy) and two US congresswomen. He was also a consultant for Matty Moroun, the owner of the Ambassador Bridge that links Detroit to Canada. It is the busiest international crossing in the U.S..

Personal life
Mongo was born on January 15, 1954, in Detroit, Michigan, and was raised in Royal Oak Township where he attended Oak Park public schools.

While a junior at Oak Park High School, he was managing editor of The Eagle American, the high school newspaper. He was the first African-American student to hold the position. During his senior year, he helped to lead the school to its first state championship in track, where he earned All State Honors.

Education
In 1972, Mongo was awarded the WJR Scholarship in Broadcast Journalism as an incoming freshman at the University of Michigan in Ann Arbor. In May 1976, he graduated, receiving his bachelor's degree with honors. He later attended Wayne State University, where he received a master's degree in labor history in 1999.

Military service
Following university, Mongo joined the U.S. Marine Corps Reserves. He received a certificate in photo journalism from the Defense Information School (DINFOS) in 1978.

Media career
From 1978 until 1983, Mongo worked as a reporter for the Colorado Springs Sun, Frederick News-Post, the South Haven (Michigan) Daily Tribune and the Michigan Chronicle newspapers.

He has appeared on the CNBC television program American Greed, as well as CNN's Anthony Bourdain: Parts Unknown.

Mongo has been featured as an expert in Detroit politics by newspapers and publications throughout the United States, including: The Weekly Standard, The New York Times, The Washington Post and GQ.

He has contributed as a columnist to The Detroit News, The Michigan Chronicle, The Michigan Citizen and Deadline Detroit and has been a regular guest on 92.3 FM (WMXD), Fox 2 News Let It Rip, WDIV (NBC) Flash Point and The Detroit News web program Hold the Onions.

Two of Mongo's newspaper advertisements, "Lynching is Still Legal in America" and "Sometimes a handshake and an acknowledgment makes a difference", sparked nationwide controversy in 2005 and 2006.

Mongo is spotlighted in chapter thirteen of Tim Skubick's book, See Dick and Jen Run (2006).  Skubick highlights Mongo's involvement in the 2006 race for Michigan governor. He is also featured in Charlie LeDuff's, book, Detroit: An American Autopsy, in a chapter titled "Mongo".

Political career
Mongo organized his first protest in April 1968, at the age of 14. When Martin Luther King Jr. was assassinated, the administrators at Clinton Junior High School refused to allow students to leave school early to attend a church service. Mongo led a walkout by black students in protest. During his senior year in high school, Mongo ran a last minute write-in campaign for student mayor of Oak Park. He won, making him the first African-American student to hold that office.

From 1984 until 1991, he was deputy director of public information under the late Detroit mayor Coleman A. Young.

In 1998, Mongo led a protest against the Detroit Medical Center when a nursing supervisor at Sinai Hospital posted a sign outside a 74-year-old patient's room demanding that African-Americans, including medical personnel, be excluded from entering his room. The supervisor was later fired.

In 2005, Mongo's attack advertisements were credited for Kwame Kilpatrick's upset win over Freman Hendrix.

In 2007, Mongo was instrumental in forcing the release of three students wrongly accused of killing a woman from Taylor, Michigan. He organized several protests that culminated in the Wayne County prosecutor, Kym Worthy, dropping the charges. The real killers were later arrested and sentenced to long prison terms.

In April 2011, Mongo led a boycott against the Detroit NAACP's 56th Annual Fight for Freedom Fund Dinner and called for NAACP president Rev. Wendell Anthony to resign his position. Mongo's complaint surrounded the "Great Expectations" Award Anthony gave to Kid Rock, a native metropolitan Detroiter, who has been known to fly the Battle Flag of the Army of Northern Virginia. Mongo said. "Rev. Anthony is making it OK for people like Kid Rock to fly the ... flag." He continued, "That flag stands for hate, racism and bigotry."

In 2016, Mongo ran State Senator Coleman Young II's campaign for mayor of Detroit, against the incumbent Mike Duggan. In 2018, he was the campaign manager for Coleman Young II's campaign for the Democratic nomination in Michigan's 13th Congressional District. The seat was vacant, due to the resignation of John Conyers.

References

External links
 
 
 The Association of Political and Public Affairs Professionals
 PR News wire Press Release
 Media Mouse Election Watch
 Detroit Public TV
 USA Today
 LinkedIn

United States Marine Corps reservists
University of Michigan alumni
American campaign managers
American political consultants
American political commentators
American social commentators
21st-century American politicians
Michigan Democrats
African-American people in Michigan politics
Politicians from Detroit
American male non-fiction writers
American political writers
African-American writers
American talk radio hosts
African-American radio personalities
Radio personalities from Detroit
American television talk show hosts
African-American television producers
African-American television personalities
African-American television talk show hosts
1954 births
Living people
Film producers from Michigan
21st-century African-American politicians
20th-century African-American people
Television producers from Michigan